Athar Amin Zargar is a KAS officer who currently holds the position of Sub-Divisional Magistrate (SDM) and is also holding the additional charge of Sub Registrar at Thathri. He is the recipient of the Best Implementation Award for best implementation of GEO MGNREGA throughout India, announced for the year 2018-19 by the Government of India.

Career
In 2017, Athar Amin Zargar was posted as Block Development Officer in Kahara area. He is the recipient of the Best Implementation Award for best implementation of GEO MGNREGA throughout India, announced for the year 2018-19 by the Government of India. 

The GEO MGNREGA program is a government initiative that aims to provide employment and livelihood opportunities to rural communities through the development of infrastructure and other public works. As a Block Development Officer, Athar Amin Zargar was responsible for overseeing the implementation of this program in Kahara and ensuring that it was executed in an efficient and effective manner.

In 2020, Zargar was posted as Sub-Divisional Magistrate (SDM) and is also holding the additional charge of Sub Registrar at Thathri.

Awards

References

Indian government officials
Living people
Year of birth missing (living people)